The CMLL International Gran Prix (1997) was a lucha libre, or professional wrestling, tournament produced and scripted by the Mexican professional wrestling promotion Consejo Mundial de Lucha Libre (CMLL; "World Wrestling Council" in Spanish) which took place on April 4, 1997 in Arena México, Mexico City, Mexico, CMLL's main venue. The 1997 International Gran Prix was the fourth time CMLL has held an International Gran Prix tournament since 1994. All International Gran Prix tournaments have been a one-night tournament, always as part of CMLL's Friday night CMLL Super Viernes shows.

The fourth International Gran Prix was a one night, 16-man single elimination tournament consisting of Mexican natives and a number of foreign wrestlers, some of which worked for CMLL on a regular basis (such as Steele and Último Dragón) and others who were invited specially for the tournament (such as Leatherface). The final match saw Steel defeat Rayo de Jalisco Jr. to win the International Gran Prix.

Production

Background
In 1994 the Mexican  professional wrestling promotion Consejo Mundial de Lucha Libre (CMLL) organized their first ever International Gran Prix tournament. The first tournament followed the standard "single elimination" format and featured sixteen wrestlers in total, eight representing Mexico and eight "international" wrestlers. In the end Mexican Rayo de Jalisco Jr. defeated King Haku in the finals to win the tournament. In 1995 CMLL brought the tournament back, creating an annual tournament held every year from 1995 through 1998 and then again in 2002, 2003 and finally from 2005 through 2008.

Storylines
The CMLL Gran Prix show featured four professional wrestling matches where wrestlers were matched up specifically for the tournament instead of as a result of pre-existing scripted feuds. The wrestlers themselves portray either faces (técnicos in Mexico, the "good guy" characters) or heels (referred to as rudos in Mexico, those that portray the "bad guys") as they perform for the fans before, during and after the matches.

Tournament

Tournament overview

Tournament brackets

Tournament show

References

1997 in professional wrestling
CMLL International Gran Prix